The 2019–20 season is Platense's 2nd consecutive season in the second division of Argentine football, Primera B Nacional.

The season generally covers the period from 1 July 2019 to 30 June 2020.

Review

Pre-season
Diego Tonetto formalised his departure to Deportivo Morón on 10 June 2019, while Gastón Suso's arrival from Atlético de Rafaela was agreed on 14 June. Gonzalo Bazán was the second name through the door, signing from Gimnasia y Esgrima (M) on 19 June. 22 June saw Joaquín Susvielles join from Almagro and Cristian Tarragona leave for Patronato. Platense loaned Manuel Capasso from Aldosivi on 25 June. In the final week of the month, Fernando Ruiz oversaw the outgoings of Abel Luciatti (San Martín (T), Gustavo Toranzo (Berazategui) and Ezequiel Gallegos (Gimnasia y Esgrima (J). Jonathan Bustos was also released after rejecting a new deal. Matías Tissera came on loan from Newell's Old Boys on 1 July, the same date that Franco Chiviló headed off to Flandria.

Daniel Vega (UAI Urquiza) and Nicolás Lugli (San Miguel) departed on 2 July. A double announcement, on 5 July, saw the incomings of Alfredo Ramírez, from Central Córdoba, and Luciano Recalde, from Rosario Central, confirmed. Platense met Independiente in a pre-season friendly on 6 July, initially playing out a goalless draw before beating the Primera División team in encounter two thanks to a goal from Gianluca Pugliese. Flandria were dispatched in back-to-back exhibition matches on 13 July, as Pugliese notched his second off-season goal alongside Tomás Luján's brace. 17 July saw San Martín (B) beaten 1–0 and 3–1 in pre-season matches; which replaced a Huracán cancellation. Javier Rossi moved to Platense from Central Córdoba on 18 July.

On 20 July, Platense suffered their first defeats of the preparation period as UAI Urquiza put three past them across two games. There was one win apiece in friendlies with Banfield Reserves on 23 July, with new player Gonzalo Bazán scoring Platense's winner. Roberto Bochi arrived to Platense from Alvarado on 25 July. They were planning to face Deportivo Armenio on 26 July, though that was later cancelled. Platense beat Gimnasia y Esgrima (LP) in a friendly fixture on 27 July. On 9 August, Platense played their final exhibition versus Boca Juniors Reserves - losing 2–1 and 3–2. Cristian Marcial was signed on loan from Racing Club on 15 August.

August
Platense began their Primera B Nacional with three points on the road against Ferro Carril Oeste on 20 August, after a goal from Facundo Curuchet was followed by a Cristian Bordacahar own-goal. A second successive victory arrived on 25 August over Estudiantes (RC), as an Alfredo Ramírez double preceded a goal from Joaquín Susvielles.

September
Platense lost their winning streak, though remained undefeated, following a draw away from home versus Nueva Chicago.

Squad

Transfers
Domestic transfer windows:3 July 2019 to 24 September 201920 January 2020 to 19 February 2020.

Transfers in

Transfers out

Loans in

Loans out

Friendlies

Pre-season
Platense revealed their initial pre-season schedule 5 July 2019, which notably included matches with Primera División duo Independiente and Huracán. They'd also meet Flandria, UAI Urquiza and Banfield Reserves. The encounter with Huracán was cancelled on 15 July, with Platense setting a fixture with Burzaco-based San Martín instead. They were also set to play Deportivo Armenio. Platense would travel to La Plata to play Gimnasia y Esgrima (LP) on 27 July, before facing Boca Juniors Reserves in early August.

Competitions

Primera B Nacional

Results summary

Matches
The fixtures for the 2019–20 league season were announced on 1 August 2019, with a new format of split zones being introduced. Platense were drawn in Zone A.

Squad statistics

Appearances and goals

Statistics accurate as of 4 September 2019.

Goalscorers

Notes

References

Club Atlético Platense seasons
Platense